The German aircraft carrier I was a planned conversion of the transport ship Europa during World War II. The loss of the battleship Bismarck and near torpedoing of her sistership Tirpitz in May 1941 and March 1942, respectively, spurred the Kriegsmarine to acquire aircraft carriers. Europa was one of several vessels selected for conversion into auxiliary aircraft carriers. As designed, the ship would have had an air complement of 24 Bf 109T fighters and 18 Ju 87C Stuka dive-bombers.

Conversion planning began in May 1942, and had the conversion been finished, she would have been the largest German aircraft carrier, longer even than the purpose-built s. The work was canceled in November 1942, however, after design problems, including serious instability and structural weaknesses, proved to be uncorrectable. No work was done on the ship, which was eventually seized by the US Army and used as a troop transport following the end of the war.

Background and proposal

The carrier I was a conversion proposal for the transport ship Europa. The ship was launched on 16 August 1928 and entered service on 19 March 1930 for the German Norddeutscher Lloyd shipping company. Starting in 1939, the ship was used as a floating barracks; the ship was requisitioned by the Kriegsmarine for use in the planned Operation Sea Lion, but the operation was abandoned when the Luftwaffe failed to achieve air superiority in the Battle of Britain. Following the loss of the battleship Bismarck in May 1941 and the near torpedoing of her sistership Tirpitz in March 1942, the Kriegsmarine was convinced of the need to acquire aircraft carriers. Several vessels were selected for conversion, including the incomplete heavy cruiser Seydlitz and several passenger liners. Planning for the conversion of Europa into an auxiliary aircraft carrier was started in May 1942.

The ship would have been faster and larger than any of the other ships Germany intended to convert into auxiliary carriers. However, a number of design problems emerged as the drawing up of the conversion plan progressed. Her speed and capacity advantages were offset by several serious practical problems. These included structural weakness, caused by the need to recess the hangar deck into the primary structural deck; instability, normally resolved by adding bulges; and high fuel consumption. Another significant obstacle was the unwillingness of Hermann Göring, the commander in chief of the Luftwaffe, to provide the Kriegsmarine with sufficient aircraft and pilots. By the time the design was completed in November 1942, these problems had proved impossible to rectify, and so the project was abandoned. As a result, no construction work began. After the end of the war, Europa was seized by the US Army and commissioned as a troop transport under the name AP 177 before being transferred to France, where she resumed her commercial duties.

Design

General characteristics and machinery
The ship's hull was divided into 16 watertight compartments and was equipped with a double bottom. The percentage of the length of the hull the double bottom extended is unknown. No armor was to have been added to the ship during the conversion process.

The turbines were powered by 24 double-ended narrow water tube boilers that produced up to 21 atmospheres of pressure. I had only one rudder. The electrical power plant comprised four diesel generators that provided 520 kilowatts and two emergency generators that provided 100 kW each. The total power output was 2,280 kW at 230 volts.

Armament

The ship was to have been armed with twelve  L/65 anti-aircraft guns in six twin mounts, three forward and three aft of the island and funnel. These guns had a total of 4,800 rounds, or 400 rounds per gun. Both types of ammunition used a single propellant charge: the  RPC/32 charge.

There were also to have been twenty  anti-aircraft guns, also in double mounts. These guns were placed along both sides of the flight deck, and had a total of 40,000 shells.

The anti-aircraft battery was rounded out by twenty-eight to thirty-six  guns in the usual Flakvierling quadruple mounts, supplied by a store of up to 72,000 rounds. These guns fired at a rate of 480 shells per minute cyclic, but were limited in practice to around 200 rounds per minute. The shells were fired at a muzzle velocity of between 800–835 m/s (2,625–2,740 ft/s), depending on the type of shell fired.

The ship was designed to carry 18 Ju 87 "Stuka" dive-bombers and 24 Bf 109. The Ju 87s were to have been the "E" variant, which was a navalized version of the Ju 87D, and were modified for catapult launches and were equipped with arresting gear. The Bf 109 fighters were a navalized version of the "E" model, designated as Bf 109T. Their wings were longer than the land-based model to allow for shorter take-off.

Footnotes

Notes

Citations

References
 
 
 
 
 
 
 

Proposed aircraft carriers
World War II aircraft carriers of Germany
Proposed ships of Germany